From Kirk to Nat is an album by pianist Kirk Lightsey that was recorded in 1990 and released by the Dutch Criss Cross Jazz label.

Reception 

The AllMusic review states "One of the main reasons why this tribute to the Nat King Cole Trio by Kirk Lightsey is a success is that Lightsey (who is from a much later bop-influenced generation) sounds nothing like Cole ... Lightsey performs a set of music reminiscent of Cole but several of the songs were never actually recorded by Cole; Lightsey takes surprisingly effective vocals on the latter two songs".

Track listing 
 "You and the Night and the Music" (Arthur Schwartz, Howard Dietz) – 6:12	
 "Sweet Lorraine" (Cliff Burwell, Mitchell Parish) – 7:42
 "Never Let Me Go" (Jay Livingston, Ray Evans) – 4:45
 "Bop Kick" (Nat King Cole) – 5:36
 "Sophisticated Lady" (Duke Ellington, Irving Mills) – 8:05
 "The Best Is Yet to Come" (C. Oliver) – 6:24
 "Close Enough for Love" (Johnny Mandel, Paul Williams) – 4:32
 "Little Old Lady" (Hoagy Carmichael, Stanley Adams) – 5:56
 "Kirk's Blues" (Kirk Lightsey) – 5:35

Personnel 
Kirk Lightsey – piano, vocals
Kevin Eubanks – guitar
Rufus Reid – bass

References 

Kirk Lightsey albums
1991 albums
Criss Cross Jazz albums
Nat King Cole tribute albums